Nixon's China Game is a documentary on Richard Nixon's 1972 visit to China.

External links 
Information
PBS Site

Films about Richard Nixon
Documentary films about presidents of the United States
Documentary films about China
American Experience
China–United States relations
Documentary films about the Cold War
1972 in China